Padua is an unincorporated community in Raymond Township, Stearns County, Minnesota, United States.  The community is located near the Junction  of Stearns County Roads 18, 22, and 192.

References

Unincorporated communities in Stearns County, Minnesota
Unincorporated communities in Minnesota